Avatar: The Way of Water is a 2022 American epic science fiction film directed and produced by James Cameron. He co-wrote the screenplay with Rick Jaffa and Amanda Silver from a story the trio wrote with Josh Friedman and Shane Salerno. Distributed by 20th Century Studios, it is the sequel to Avatar (2009) and the second installment in the Avatar film series. Cast members Sam Worthington, Zoe Saldaña, Stephen Lang, Joel David Moore, CCH Pounder, Giovanni Ribisi, Dileep Rao, and Matt Gerald reprise their roles from the original film, with Sigourney Weaver returning in an additional role. New cast members include Kate Winslet, Cliff Curtis, Edie Falco, and Jemaine Clement. Its story follows a Na'vi named Jake Sully (Worthington) as he and his family, under renewed human threat, seek refuge with the Metkayina clan of Pandora.

Cameron stated in 2006 that he would like to make sequels to Avatar if it was successful, and he announced the first two sequels in 2010, following the widespread success of the first film, with the first sequel aiming for a 2014 release. However, the addition of two more sequels, for a total of five Avatar films, and the necessity to develop new technology to film performance capture scenes underwater, a feat never accomplished before, led to significant delays to allow the crew more time to work on the writing, preproduction and visual effects. The filming process, which occurred simultaneously with a currently untitled third film, began in Manhattan Beach, California, on August 15, 2017. The filming location moved to Wellington on September 25, 2017, which ended in late September 2020 after three years of shooting. With an estimated budget of $350–460 million, the film is one of the most expensive films ever made.

The film received positive reviews from critics, who praised its visual effects and technical achievements but criticized the plot and lengthy runtime. The film was a major box office success, breaking multiple records, and grossing over $2.303 billion worldwide, making it the highest-grossing film of 2022, the highest-grossing film of the COVID-19 pandemic era and the third-highest-grossing film of all time. Organizations like the National Board of Review and the American Film Institute named it as one of the top ten films of 2022. Among its many accolades, the film was nominated for four awards at the 95th Academy Awards, including Best Picture, and won for Best Visual Effects. Three further sequels are in production, with the next film set to be released on December 20, 2024.

Plot 

Sixteen years after the Na'vi repelled the RDA invasion of Pandora, Jake Sully lives as chief of the Omatikaya clan and raises a family with Neytiri, which includes sons Neteyam and Lo'ak, daughter Tuk, and adopted children Kiri (born from Grace Augustine's inert avatar) and Spider, the Pandora-born human son of the late Colonel Miles Quaritch. To the Na'vi's dismay, the RDA, led by their new leader, Frances Ardmore, returns to colonize Pandora as Earth is dying. Among the new arrivals are Recombinants—Na'vi avatars implanted with deceased human soldiers' memories—with Quaritch's recombinant serving as the leader.

A year later, Jake leads a guerilla campaign against the RDA. During a counterinsurgency mission, Quaritch and his subordinates capture Jake's children. Jake and Neytiri arrive and free them, killing several of Quaritch's soldiers, but Spider remains captured by Quaritch, who recognizes him as his son. After the RDA fails to get information from Spider, Quaritch decides to spend time with his son to draw him on his side. In turn, Spider teaches Quaritch about Na'vi culture and language. Aware of the danger posed by Spider's knowledge of his whereabouts, Jake and his family exile themselves from the Omatikaya and retreat to Pandora's eastern seaboard, where the Metkayina clan gives them refuge. There, the family learns the ways of the reef people, Kiri develops a spiritual bond with the sea, and Lo'ak befriends Tsireya, the daughter of chief Tonowari and his wife, Ronal.

After defending Kiri against Aonung, Tonowari's son, Lo'ak apologizes at Jake's insistence. Aonung and his friends then entice Lo'ak to a trip into a sea predator's territory and leave him stranded. After being saved from a giant sea beast, Lo'ak is befriended by Payakan, a Tulkun—an intelligent and pacifistic whale-like species whom the Metkayina consider their spiritual brethren. Upon his return, Lo'ak wins Aonung's friendship by taking the blame for the trip but is told that Payakan is an outcast among the Tulkun. Later, Kiri links to the Metkayina's underwater Spirit Tree and spiritually "meets" her biological mother, Grace, whose consciousness lives within Pandora. During the link-induced trance, Kiri suffers a seizure and falls unconscious, nearly drowning.

Jake summons Norm Spellman and Max Patel for help using their medical equipment, where they diagnose Kiri with epilepsy and warn that she cannot connect to the Spirit Tree again, as doing so may kill her. Although Ronal saves Kiri, Quaritch tracks Norm and Max's aircraft to the archipelago where the Metkayina live. Bringing Spider with him, Quaritch joins forces with the RDA's marine operations, led by Captain Mick Scoresby, and commandeers a whaling vessel that hunts Tulkuns to extract an anti-aging serum called amrita. Quaritch's squad raids the archipelago, interrogating the tribes about Jake's location to no avail. Quaritch then orders the whalers to kill Tulkuns near the villages to draw Jake out. Lo'ak mentally links with Payakan and learns that he was cast out because he went against the pacifist ways of his species and attacked the whalers who killed his mother, causing many deaths.

When the Metkayina learns of the Tulkun killings, Lo'ak warns Payakan, followed by his siblings and friends. They find Payakan being hunted, and Quaritch captures Lo'ak, Tsireya, and Tuk. Jake, Neytiri, and the Metkayina set out to confront the humans and rescue the kids. Quaritch forces Jake to surrender, but Payakan attacks the whalers, triggering a fight between the Metkayina and the crew members. Spider cripples the vessel, and Payakan severs Scoresby's arm. Neteyam rescues Lo'ak, Tsireya, and Spider but is killed after being fatally shot by Quaritch. Devastated, both parents go back to save their remaining children that were recaptured; upon facing Quaritch's team, Neytiri flies into a grieving rage and brutally murders many of them, accidentally breaking her father's bow in the process. Jake faces Quaritch, who uses Kiri as a hostage, and when Neytiri does the same with Spider, Quaritch at first denies their relationship but desists once Neytiri attempts to kill Spider.

Jake, Quaritch, Neytiri, and Tuk are trapped inside the sinking vessel. After a tense skirmish, Jake strangles Quaritch unconscious and is rescued by Lo'ak and Payakan, while Kiri rescues Neytiri and Tuk. Spider rescues Quaritch but refuses to go with him and rejoins Jake's family, at which point he is welcomed as a true son. After Neteyam's funeral, Jake informs Tonowari of his decision to leave the Metkayina. Still, the chief respectfully identifies Jake as part of the clan and welcomes him and his family to stay. Before vowing to resume their campaign against the RDA, Jake and his family accept and live their new life at sea.

Cast 

 Sam Worthington as Jake Sully, a former human, who fell in love with Neytiri and befriended the Na'vi after becoming a member of the Avatar Program, eventually taking their side in their conflict with humans and leading them to victory. He left his human body to permanently become Na'vi and is now chief of the Omatikaya.
 Zoe Saldaña as Neytiri te Tskaha Mo'at'ite (Neytiri Sully), daughter of the previous clan chief, future Tsahìk of the clan, and Jake's mate.
 Sigourney Weaver as Kiri te Suli Kireysi'ite (Kiri Sully), the 14-year-old daughter of Dr. Grace Augustine's Na'vi avatar who was adopted by Jake and Neytiri. Weaver originally appeared in the first film as Dr. Grace Augustine, a human scientist who took the side of the Na'vi and died during the conflict; her Na'vi avatar is revealed to have birthed Kiri despite her death. Like most of the cast, she learned free-diving for the film and filmed scenes underwater.
 Weaver also reprises her role as Dr. Grace Augustine, despite Weaver stating in 2014 that she would not do so, though she and Cameron confirmed prior to then that she would return in the sequels: she appears in this film in a video recording and in a spiritual vision where she meets with Kiri.
 Stephen Lang as Colonel Miles Quaritch, a human military officer who led the paramilitary security division of the RDA in their conflict with the Na'vi. After being killed by Neytiri in 2154, he is revived as a recombinant and seeks revenge against Jake and his family. Cameron stated in 2010 that Lang would return in the first three sequels, stating, "I'm not going to say exactly how we're bringing him back, but it's a science fiction story, after all. His character will evolve into really unexpected places across the arc of our new three-film saga." He later stated that Quaritch would act as the main antagonist once again, in all four sequels.
 Lang also reprises his role as the original human Quaritch of the first movie in a video recording made for his recombinant self.
 Kate Winslet as Ronal, a free diver of the Metkayina and Tonowari's wife, who is pregnant. Winslet called Ronal "a pivotal character in the ongoing story" but also "relatively small comparative to the lengthy shoot" since shooting all her scenes only took a month. It marks her first time working with performance capture, and motion capture altogether. She, like most of the cast, also had to learn free diving for the film; while filming an underwater scene, she held her breath for over seven minutes, a new record for any film scene shot underwater.
 Cliff Curtis as Tonowari, the chief of the Metkayina clan and Ronal's husband
 Joel David Moore as Dr. Norm Spellman, a former member of the Avatar Program who chose to side with the Na'vi in the first film.
 Moore also portrays Spellman while in his Na'vi Avatar.
 CCH Pounder as Mo'at, the Omatikaya's Tsahìk, and Neytiri's mother.
 Edie Falco as General Frances Ardmore, the commander in charge of the RDA's interests.
 Brendan Cowell as Captain Mick Scoresby, the head of an RDA private sector marine hunting vessel on the planet of Pandora.
 Jemaine Clement as Dr. Ian Garvin, a marine biologist working for the RDA.
 Jamie Flatters as Neteyam te Suli Tsyeyk'itan (Neteyam Sully), Jake and Neytiri's 16-year-old son and oldest child.
 Joel David Moore's son, Oliver, cameos as an infant Neteyam.
 Britain Dalton as Lo'ak te Suli Tsyeyk'itan (Lo'ak Sully), Jake and Neytiri's 14-year-old son.
 Chloe Coleman as young Lo'ak.
 Trinity Jo-Li Bliss as Tuktirey "Tuk" te Suli Neytiri'ite (Tuktirey "Tuk" Sully), Jake and Neytiri's 8-year-old daughter and their youngest child.
 Jack Champion as Miles "Spider" Socorro, the 16-year-old son of Quaritch born in Hell's Gate (the human base on Pandora in the first film) who was raised by scientists who stayed back on Pandora. He is inseparable from Jake and Neytiri's children.
 Bailey Bass as Tsireya ("Reya"), a graceful and strong free diver of the Metkayina and Tonowari and Ronal's daughter
 Filip Geljo as Aonung, a young male hunter, a free diver of the Metkayina, and Tonowari and Ronal's son
 Duane Evans, Jr. as Rotxo, a young male hunter and free diver of the Metkayina
 Giovanni Ribisi as Parker Selfridge, the former corporate administrator for the RDA mining operation, who appears in a recording made for Quaritch's Recombinant.
 Dileep Rao as Dr. Max Patel, a scientist who worked in the Avatar Program and came to support Jake's rebellion against the RDA in the first film.
 Matt Gerald as Corporal Lyle Wainfleet, a human mercenary who fought and died in the RDA's battle against the Na'vi in 2154. Following the RDA's return to Pandora, he is revived as a recombinant and placed under Quaritch's command. Gerald was announced to reprise his role in August 2017.
Gerald also reprises his role as the original human Wainfleet from the first film shown in Quaritch's video recording.

Additionally, Alicia Vela-Bailey appears, uncredited, as Zdinarsk, a recombinant and member of the 1st Recom Squadron. Vela-Bailey previously portrayed Ikeyni, Saeyla, and a blonde woman in a bar in the original Avatar. She is also featured as a stunt performer in both films. CJ Jones appears, also uncredited, as a Metkayina interpreter of the Na'vi sign language he created.

Themes and analysis 
Family is the central concept featured in Avatar: The Way of Water, with Kate Winslet and James Cameron, whom Sigourney Weaver based on his, respectively asserting that the main theme is the maintainance of their relationship and willingness to take risks; this compared it to the films of The Godfather franchise (1972–1990). RogerEbert.com critic Brian Tallerico notes that some of the themes in the film echo themes from earlier films directed by Cameron, including Titanic, Aliens (1986), The Abyss (1989), The Terminator (1984) and Terminator 2: Judgment Day (1991). For example, the film asks whether you should run and hide from a powerful enemy or fight their evil, similar to the Terminator films. The film also invokes themes of environmentalism and settler colonialism. Comparing the themes of the sequels to the original, Cameron stated that "It will be a natural extension of all the themes, and the characters, and the spiritual undercurrents. Basically, if you loved the first movie, you're gonna love these movies, and if you hated it, you're probably gonna hate these. If you loved it at the time, and you said later you hated it, you're probably gonna love these".

Production

Development 

In 2006, Cameron stated that if Avatar (2009) was successful, he would consider making two sequels. In 2010, he said the sequels would proceed as planned as a result of the film's widespread success. He included certain scenes in the first film for future story follow-ups. Cameron planned to shoot the sequels back-to-back and to begin work "once the novel is nailed down". He stated that the sequels would widen the universe while exploring other moons of Polyphemus. The first sequel would focus on the ocean of Pandora and also feature more of the rainforest. He intended to capture footage for the sequel at the bottom of the Mariana Trench using a deepwater submersible. In 2011, Cameron stated that he was just starting to design the ocean ecosystem of Pandora and the other worlds to be included in the story. The storyline, although continuing the environmental theme of the first film, would not be "strident" since the film will concentrate on entertainment. The sequels were confirmed as continuing to follow the characters of Jake and Neytiri in December 2009. Cameron implied that the humans would return as the antagonists of the story. In 2011, Cameron stated his intention to film the sequels at a higher frame rate than the industry standard 24 frames per second, to add a heightened sense of reality.

In 2013, Cameron announced that the sequels would be filmed in New Zealand, with performance capture to take place in 2014. An agreement with the New Zealand government required at least one world premiere to be held in Wellington and at least NZ$500 million (approximately US$410 million at December 2013 exchange rates) to be spent on production activity in New Zealand, including live-action filming and visual effects. The New Zealand government announced it would raise its baseline tax rebate for filmmaking from 15% to 20%, with 25% available to international productions in some cases and 40% for New Zealand productions (as defined by section 18 of the New Zealand Film Commission Act 1978).

Cameron mentioned a possible third sequel for the first time in 2012; and was officially confirmed the following year. Cameron was then looking to release Avatar 2 in 2015, but later that year, production was rescheduled for 2014, with the film to be released in December 2016, and to be followed by the two other sequels in 2017 and 2018. By 2015, the scheduled release dates for the sequels were each delayed by another year, with the first sequel expected to be released in December 2017; this was due to the writing process, which Cameron called "a complex job". The following month, Fox announced a further release delay. In February 2016, production of the sequels was scheduled to begin in April 2016 in New Zealand. In April 2016, Cameron announced at CinemaCon that there will be four Avatar sequels, all of which will be filmed simultaneously. The four Avatar sequels share a $1 billion budget (e.g. $250 million each film).

New crew members include cinematographer Russell Carpenter, who worked with Cameron on True Lies (1994) and Titanic (1997), and Aashrita Kamath, who will act as art director on all four sequels. Kirk Krack, founder of Performance Freediving International, worked as a free-diving trainer for the cast and crew for the underwater scenes. Several creatures that were first introduced in the Walt Disney World theme park attraction Avatar Flight of Passage were featured in the film.

In 2019, after several media outlets shared rumors of potential titles for the Avatar sequels, including the name Avatar: The Way of Water, Cameron confirmed that the titles mentioned were "among titles that are in consideration" but had not been finalized at the time.

In 2022, Cameron said that about ten minutes of "gunplay action" were cut from the film as he was no longer inclined to "fetishize the gun", although he is known as an "action filmmaker".

Writing 
In 2012, Cameron stated that the sequels were being written as "separate stories that have an overall arc inclusive of the first film", with the second having a clear conclusion instead of a cliffhanger to the next film. Screenwriters were also announced: Josh Friedman for the first, Rick Jaffa and Amanda Silver for the second, and Shane Salerno for the third. However, Friedman later clarified and stated that Jaffa and Silver were writing the first of the four sequels and he was writing the second. In April 2014, Cameron expected to finish the (then) three scripts within six weeks, stating that all three sequels would be in production simultaneously and were still slated for December 2016 to 2018 releases. He stated that although Friedman, Jaffa and Silver, and Salerno are each co-writing one sequel with him, they at first worked together on all three scripts: "I didn't assign each writer which film they were going to work on until the last day. I knew if I assigned them their scripts ahead of time, they'd tune out every time we were talking about the other movie." Cameron added that they had "worked out every beat of the story across all three films so it all connects as one, sort of, three-film saga", a creative process that was inspired by his experiences in the writing room of his television series Dark Angel. The writing took longer than expected, forcing Cameron to delay the release of the films further in 2015.

He spent a year writing and completing a full script for the first sequel titled Avatar: The High Ground, a 130-page treatment and then threw it out and started over because "it didn't go enough into the unexpected," which is one of the critical elements about sequels, according to Cameron. At one point he threatened to fire his writers because they would only focus on the new stories rather than first figuring out what made the original movie a success. In December 2015, Cameron stated in an interview with Entertainment Weekly, saying "I'm in the process of doing another pass through all three scripts [...] Just refining. That's in parallel with the design process. The design process is very mature at this point. We've been designing for about a year and a half. All the characters, settings and creatures are all pretty much [set]." On February 11, 2017, Cameron announced that the writing of all four sequels was complete. In a November 26 interview the same year, he estimated that the scripts had taken four years to write overall. One element in The High Ground, showing an outer space battle between Na'vi, humans, and spaceships, was cut; this was later used in the prequel novel of the same name. Cameron cited the omission of the sequel's core aspects, which were insufficient, as reasons for the removal.

Discussing the character of Tuk in a February 2019 interview, Cameron mentioned that she was eight years old, and that the film would feature a scene between Jake and Neytiri taking place from Tuk's perspective: "There's a three-page argument scene between Jake and Neytiri, a marital dispute, very, very critical to the storyline. I wound up shooting it all from the point of view of the 8-year-old hiding under the structure and peeking in. Having gone through the experience with [Sam Worthington] on Avatar, I now knew how to write the Jake character going forward across the emotional rollercoaster of the next four movies." Cameron stated that the film addresses the implications of Jake and Neytiri becoming parents in the time that elapsed since the first film. He stated: In a December 2019 interview, Lang stated that his character was always meant to return in the sequels, as Cameron had shared with him "that Quaritch had a future" while shooting the original film.

Casting 

Sam Worthington and Zoe Saldaña were confirmed in January 2010 to have signed on to reprise their roles in the sequels. Later that year, Cameron confirmed that both Weaver and Stephen Lang would return despite the demise of their characters. Cameron also stated that Weaver would be featured in all three sequels (the fourth one was not planned at the time), and that her character, Grace Augustine, would be alive. In March 2015, however, Weaver said that she will play a new character in the next film. Cameron confirmed in 2010 that Lang would return as Quaritch in the first three sequels, stating, "I'm not going to say exactly how we're bringing him back, but it's a science fiction story, after all. His character will evolve into really unexpected places across the arc of our new three-film saga." In September 2015, Michelle Rodriguez stated that unlike Weaver and Lang, whose characters had also died in the first film, she would not return in Avatar 2.

Several new cast announcements were made in 2017, with Joel David Moore, CCH Pounder and Matt Gerald all confirmed to return from the first film. Additionally, Cliff Curtis joined the cast as Tonowari, the leader of the Na'vi reef people clan of Metkayina. On September 23, 2017, child actor Filip Geljo was revealed to have been signed in an undisclosed role. On September 27, seven child actors were confirmed as a part of the main cast including Geljo: Jamie Flatters, Britain Dalton, and Trinity Bliss as Jake and Neytiri's children; Geljo, Bailey Bass, and Duane Evans Jr. as members of the Metkayina (together with Curtis); and Jack Champion, the only one to perform in live action, as a human born on Pandora. Cameron later stated that the child cast had been trained for six months to prepare for the underwater scenes filmed in performance capture, and that they now could all hold their breath "in the two- to four-minute range", even then-seven-year-old Trinity Bliss, and were now "all perfectly capable of acting underwater, very calmly while holding their breath".

On October 3, 2017, it was reported that Winslet, who starred in Cameron's Titanic, had joined the cast of Avatar 2, and possibly its sequels. Cameron commented, "Kate and I had been looking for something to do together for 20 years, since our collaboration on Titanic, which was one of the most rewarding of my career", and added that her character was named Ronal. When asked by ComicBook.com on her reasons to return to work with Cameron, Winslet stated that he just asked her to play Ronal and she accepted out of a combination of her love for the first Avatar film, an attraction to the well-written and strong female role she was offered, a love for being on the water and to work with Cameron and the film's cast. Although the nature of her character was originally unknown, Cameron stated the following month that Ronal was "part of the Sea People, the reef people", in reference to the Na'vi clan of Metkayina, making Avatar 2 Winslet's first role via performance capture, or motion capture altogether, which she was looking forward to; since she insisted on performing all of her character's movements herself, she, like the child cast, had to learn free diving for the film. Winslet, who had been notoriously reluctant about working with Cameron again because of the complicated situations he puts his actors in for their scenes, stated that Cameron proposed the role to her in July 2017 when he came to help her and their fellow Titanic collaborator Leonardo DiCaprio at a fundraiser in France, sending her the scripts shortly after. She commented that her role was "relatively small comparative to the lengthy shoot", as she would only have one month of shootings, but also "a pivotal character in the ongoing story".

On October 13, 2017, it was announced that Giovanni Ribisi would reprise his role of Parker Selfridge from the first film, in all four upcoming Avatar films. On January 25, 2018, Dileep Rao was confirmed to return as Dr. Max Patel. A year later, Edie Falco, Brendan Cowell and Jemaine Clement joined the cast in live-action roles. Marc Maron also auditioned for Clement's part. Edward Norton turned down an undisclosed role in Avatar 2, due to only being interested in playing a Na'vi, which his proposed character was not. Joel David Moore's then infant son, Oliver, filmed a brief cameo as an infant Neteyam.

Filming

Performance capture 
Avatar: The Way of Water entered production and started preliminary shooting on August 15, 2017, with Manhattan Beach, California, as the main shooting location. Principal photography started on September 25, 2017, simultaneously with Avatar 3 (2024). As Weaver later revealed in November, filming had to be moved around to allow her to film a cameo appearance in the series eight finale of Doc Martin (2004–present).

On November 23, Cameron stated that the crew had been undergoing tests with the cast for the last month to film underwater scenes in performance capture, and that they succeeded in filming the first of those on November 14, featuring six of their seven main child actors, including Trinity Bliss. He stated "we're getting really good data, beautiful character motion and great facial performance capture. We've basically cracked the code". He said that tests would last until January 2018, as "we're still working in our small test tank. We graduate to our big tank in January". It was "a dialogue scene", as according to Cameron, the characters communicate via "a kind of a sign language".

On April 30, 2018, Winslet had "just a couple days" of shooting left to do. While filming an underwater scene, Winslet held her breath for over seven minutes, breaking the record for longest breath held while shooting a film scene underwater, a record previously held by Tom Cruise for Mission: Impossible – Rogue Nation (2015). In May 2018, Saldaña stated that filming was "kind of only halfway done" and that the crew is "about [to finish] motion capture production on the [second and third] movies, and then after that, they go straight into pre-production for the live-action part that would shoot for six months in New Zealand." Saldaña finished shooting her scenes on June 8, for both Avatar 2 and its sequel, while Cameron stated around the same time that 130 days of performance capture had been shot. On November 14, 2018, Cameron announced filming with the principal performance capture cast had been completed.

While part of the movie was shot at 24 frames per second, many fast scenes have been recorded at 48 frames per second. This allows fast objects still to be clearly visible while moving, while it was also claimed that too detailed view sometimes causes the viewer to see playing actors rather than story characters. The projector in the movie hall runs at 48 frames per second, for the 24 fps sections frames are duplicated.

Live-action 
In February 2019, Landau stated that live-action filming for Avatar 2 and 3 would commence in New Zealand in the spring of 2019. Cameron confirmed later the same month that they had "only wrapped for [the motion capture parts]. Now, that is the vast majority of the characters and it is the vast majority of the running time of the film[s]. But that pesky little live action component is going to cost me five months of my life across the two movies." Filming for 2019 concluded on November 29, to resume the following year in New Zealand.

On March 17, 2020, Landau announced that the filming of the Avatar sequel films in New Zealand had been postponed indefinitely in response to the COVID-19 pandemic. He also confirmed that production would remain in Los Angeles. However, virtual production continued in Manhattan Beach, California while visual effects continued at Weta Digital in Wellington. In early May, health and safety production protocols had been endorsed by the New Zealand government, allowing filming to resume in the country.

On June 1, 2020, Landau posted a picture of himself and Cameron on Instagram, showing that they had returned to New Zealand to resume filming. After their arrival, Cameron and 55 other crew members who had traveled to New Zealand started a 2-week government-supervised isolation period at a hotel in Wellington before they would resume filming. This would make Avatar 2 and 3 the first major Hollywood blockbusters to resume production after postponing filming due to the pandemic. On June 16, 2020, Cameron resumed filming and Landau posted a photo of his crew on Instagram filming the production. The New Zealand production hired 46 New Zealand cast members including Cliff Curtis (Tonowari) and Duane Evans Jr. (Roxto), 114 local stunt artists, almost 800 extras, and 36 apprentices and interns. In September 2020, Cameron confirmed that live action filming in New Zealand had been completed, therefore completing the shooting of the film altogether after over three years; he estimated Avatar 3 to be "95%" completed, due to having live-action parts yet to be filmed outside of New Zealand.

In July 2022, the New Zealand Film Commission disclosed that the Avatar sequels had received over NZ$140 million worth of public funding through the country's Screen Production Grant. By comparison, The Hobbit trilogy (2012–2014) had received NZ$161 million in film subsidies. While ACT party deputy leader Brooke van Velden criticised the Government's film subsidy programme for allegedly taking public funding from other areas, the Economic Development and Regional Development Minister Stuart Nash argued that New Zealand's film subsidies for major Hollywood products brought much needed overseas investment and jobs to the New Zealand film industry.

Visual effects 

On July 31, 2017, it was announced that Wētā FX had commenced work on the Avatar sequels. The film heavily features underwater scenes, actually filmed underwater with the cast in performance capture. Blending underwater filming and performance capture being a feature never accomplished before, it took the team a year and a half to develop a new motion capture system. In December 2022, Wētā FX's VFX producer David Conley describe Avatar 2 as the biggest visual effects project that the company had ever undertaken, totalling nearly 3.3 billion thread powers. To cope with the huge amount of data, Wētā used the services of cloud storage company Amazon Web Services.

Landau stated in November 2015 that Avatar 2 would have a number of major technological improvements since the first movie. A lot more of the lighting work on the virtual production stage could be done during production instead of post-production, and like Alita: Battle Angel (2019), which is produced and co-written by Cameron, the crew can use two lightweight HD head cams to record the actors' facial performance. In addition they also used two digital puppets instead of just one; one that is an accurate copy of the real actor, and another that is the actor's character, allowing the team to re-target one onto the other to make it as accurate as possible.

Cameron stated that there was a possibility that the film could be shown in "glasses-free 3D", along with the sequels. But he later disagreed with these rumors and did not think the technology would be there yet.

Later, Industrial Light & Magic was also contacted to add some special effects and CGI.

The film was completed on November 23, 2022.

Runtime 
In July 2022, Empire revealed the runtime was "around three hours" at that stage in production. In November 2022, the film's runtime was revealed to be 192 minutes (3 hours 12 minutes). In the Empire interview, Cameron stated, "I don't want anybody whining about length when they sit and binge-watch [television] for eight hours... I've watched my kids sit and do five one-hour episodes in a row. Here's the big social paradigm shift that has to happen: it's okay to get up and go pee."

Avatar: The Way of Water is the second Disney-distributed film and the second 20th Century Studios film, after Avengers: Endgame and Titanic respectively, to exceed three hours in length.

Music 

Avatar composer James Horner was originally reported to score music for the franchise, before his death in a plane crash in June 2015. In December 2019, Simon Franglen, who had previously worked with both Cameron and Horner as record producer and arranger since 1997's Titanic, including on Avatar (notably completing Horner's score for 2016's The Magnificent Seven after his passing), was reported to write music for the film. Landau confirmed his involvement in the project in August 2021, while also associating with the forthcoming Avatar sequels. Horner's score will be reused in the film, in addition to the original themes produced by Franglen. The scoring for Avatar: The Way of Water officially began on July 29, 2022. The soundtrack album was released on December 16, 2022, by Hollywood Records. An expanded score album, featuring 10 more tracks from the original score, followed four days later.

In November 2022, it was reported that the film would feature an original song titled "Song Chord" which will be performed by Franglen and Zoe Saldaña. The following month, it was announced that Canadian singer the Weeknd would contribute an original song, "Nothing Is Lost (You Give Me Strength)", to the film, produced by Franglen and Swedish supergroup Swedish House Mafia.

Marketing 
Disney extensively promoted Avatar: The Way of Water across multiple media platforms, including merchandising, consumer products, theme parks and advertising.
At the 2022 CinemaCon, the new title for the sequel was officially announced and the first teaser trailer was debuted at the event, along with four new first look images, showing off the adventures of the Na'vi on and off the coasts of Pandora. It was theatrically showcased at the premiere of Doctor Strange in the Multiverse of Madness, and was later released online on May 9. The teaser finished its first 24-hour online window with 148.6 million views, including 23 million from China alone, according to Disney and 20th Century. Grant Ridner of GQ commented "The trailer features minimal dialogue and primarily focuses on shots of the cerulean Pandora and its residents, as well as indigenous flora and fauna." However, Stuart Heritage of The Guardian criticized the teaser saying that "There isn't a trace of premise here, or character, or any real action to speak of. Instead, we're given a minute and a half of nice-looking scenery. It's like being held hostage to look at someone's holiday photos." Louis Chilton of The Independent also felt that the trailer "feels rather too much like a tech demo, or the trailer for a long-gestating video-game sequel".

In June 2022, the teaser was edited by Disney ahead of the theatrical screenings of Pixar's Lightyear, where sequences featuring Sully holding a rifle and few guns were edited. According to Russ Burlingame of Comic Book Resources, the trailer was edited due to "public sentiments to avoid glorifying gun violence" as Lightyear released after the Robb Elementary School shooting incident, while TheWrap's Drew Taylor opined that the change was made on the request of Motion Picture Association for attaching the trailer with PG-rated films. New set photos were released by Empire on June 30, showing Kate Winslet and Cliff Curtis in their Na'vi forms, and subsequent photos were released on the following day, showing Sigourney Weaver as Jake and Neytiri's adopted teenage Na'vi daughter, Kiri. Though the film was not promoted at the San Diego Comic-Con event, Lego released four new sets from the franchise as a part of the promotions.

Eight minutes of the film's footage were showcased in 3D at the D23 Expo on September 10, 2022. McFarlane Toys had launched several action figures based on the characters and creatures, which were unveiled at the event. The collections were officially released on October 1. A second excerpt from the film was shown during the credits of the Avatar re-release on September 23, which evidently varies in different versions and screenings. The official trailer was released on November 2 at Good Morning America. New poster characters were released on November 21, and the second and final trailer was also released then. An 18-minute clip of "never-seen-before" footage from the film was exclusively released at the CCXP convention on December 2. The footage features independent storylines surrounding Jake's character and events occurring several years since the first film.

Disney initiated the environmental global campaign, "Keep Our Oceans Amazing", to support the Nature Conservancy in the conservation of marine habitats and animal species. A concept art book titled The Art of Avatar: The Way of Water, written by Tara Bennett with foreword by Robert Rodriguez, was made available for pre-order in October 2022, and was set to be released simultaneously with the film. Another book titled, Avatar The Way of Water: The Visual Dictionary by Joshua Izzo is also set to be released with the film.

Deadline Hollywood estimated that advertisers paid more than $170 million for promos. Lightstorm Entertainment and Mercedes-Benz revealed the Vision AVTR concept car inspired by the film at the Consumer Electronics Show in 2020. Amazon Echo enabled interactions for its Alexa virtual assistant based on the film, the first time it did so for any film. In China, Disney partnered with JD.com and Alipay for advertising, while Razer Inc. launched the Yaqi Orochi V2 Avatar computer mouse in the country themed after the film. NYX Professional Makeup owned by L'Oréal promoted a lineup of makeup products inspired by the film. Kellogg's launched an estimated 53 million Avatar-themed packages across its three labels. Motorola Mobility and Deutsche Telekom partnered with Disney to promote the film in Latin America and EMEA respectively.

Release 
Avatar: The Way of Water's world premiere was held on December 6, 2022, at the Odeon Luxe Leicester Square in London. The film began rolling out in theaters in some countries on December 14, 2022, and was theatrically released in the United States on December 16, with distribution by Walt Disney Studios Motion Pictures through the 20th Century Studios label. The film is the first in the series to be released under Disney, since its acquisition of both 20th Century Studios and the rights to Avatar in 2019. The film was released in RealD 3D, Dolby Cinema, IMAX, and IMAX 3D formats. Select showings also had support for a dynamic high frame rate of up to 48 frames per second. The Way of Water, alongside the forthcoming sequels, was released in Dolby Vision. The Way of Water is one of the widest releases ever given for a Disney film, debuting on over 12,000 screens in the United States and Canada and 40,000 internationally.

The 2023 Hollywood Professional Association Tech Retreat revealed that 1,065 individual Digital Cinema Packages (DCPs) were created for the film's theatrical release. This includes specific variations of the film presented in formats such as 2D, 3D, HDR, 4K, varying light levels, aspect ratios, various audio formats as well as 51 subtitled languages and 28 dubbed language variations. According to Disney's Motion Pictures Operations VP Kim Beresford, the film was divided into 15 reels (resulting in 6,338 portions) to be completed in time; allowing the DCP mastering team to begin creating delivery elements before the complete film was locked. Roughly 800 DCPs were reviewed for quality control five days prior to the film's release date. Walt Disney Studios' VP of Distribution Technology Mark Arana stated "We had to turn our operation into a 24/7 support model." Additionally, Disney's distribution team invented a new system to create and keep track of the numerous versions as well as a cloud-based DCP mastering tool.

The film was subjected to eight delays, as the crew took more time on the writing, pre-production and visual effects process. Initially in late-2010, the film was scheduled for release in December 2014. By mid-2013, Cameron originally intended Avatar 2 to be released in December 2015, which was subsequently delayed to 2016 and then to 2017. In April 2016, Cameron announced four Avatar sequels which would be released in December 2018, 2020, 2022 and 2023; but, in March 2017, he stated that this film would not be released in 2018, due to extensive production and the visual effects process.

In April 2017, a new release date of December 18, 2020, was announced, with all the other sequels: Avatar 3, 4 and 5 releasing on December 17, 2021, December 20, 2024, and December 19, 2025, respectively. However, following the announcement of the three upcoming Star Wars films, in May 2019, the sequels were delayed another two years, with this film being scheduled to be released on December 17, 2021. The release date was again deferred due to the COVID-19 pandemic, and in August 2020, a new release date of December 16, 2022, was announced. Mentioning the delays, Cameron felt optimistic that they would not harm the films' success, likening Avatar 2 to his films Aliens (1986) and Terminator 2: Judgment Day (1991), which were both commercially successful sequels released seven years after the original films. The film was also approved for release in China, making it one of the few Hollywood blockbusters to be greenlit for distribution in the country in 2022.

Home media 

Walt Disney Studios Home Entertainment will release Avatar: The Way of Water for digital download on March 28, 2023. This will contain behind-the-scenes featurettes.

Reception

Box office 

, Avatar: The Way of Water has grossed $678.1million in the United States and Canada, and $1.625billion in other territories, for a worldwide total of $2.303billion. It had a worldwide opening of $441.7 million, the 11th-biggest of all time, and the third largest in the COVID-19 pandemic era, behind Spider-Man: No Way Home ($601 million) and Doctor Strange in the Multiverse of Madness ($452.4 million). IMAX accounted for $48.8 million, the second-highest global weekend ever for a film released in IMAX cinemas. It is the highest-grossing film of 2022, the third-highest-grossing film of all time, and the highest-grossing film of the pandemic era.

It is the fourth film to reach the $1 billion milestone in the pandemic era after Spider-Man: No Way Home, Top Gun: Maverick and Jurassic World Dominion, as well as the sixth-fastest overall to reach the milestone at 14 days. It crossed the $2 billion milestone on January 22, becoming the first film in pandemic era and the sixth in history to reach the milestone. It is also the second-fastest to gross over $2 billion, reaching the milestone in 40 days.

United States and Canada 

By December 14, 2022, prior to the film's release in the United States and Canada, Boxoffice Pro projected an opening weekend of $145–179 million, and a total final gross of $574–803 million. The film made $53.2 million on its first day, including $17 million from Thursday night previews. It went on to debut to a $134.1 million weekend, nearly double the original's opening of $77 million, coming in below expectations while finishing first at the box office. Deadline Hollywood and Variety wrote that strong audience exit scores, the small day-to-day drop, limited competition from other films, and the upcoming Christmas holiday all indicated likely strong legs at the box office.

The film made $63.3 million in its second weekend, a drop of 53%, and $95.6 million over the four-day Christmas weekend, remaining atop the box office. Box office analysts partially attributed the December 2022 North American winter storm for the drop. In the third weekend it grossed $67.4 million for an increase of 6%, and also grossed $88.8 million through the four-day New Year weekend, while becoming the second highest-grossing film of 2022 in the region. It remained the highest-grossing film at the box office throughout its first seven weekends of release, the highest number of consecutive weekends for any film since the original Avatar. It is also the eighth-highest grossing film of all time in the US and Canada.

China 
On the release day of Avatar: The Way of Water, Tianjin Maoyan Weiying Culture Media estimated that the film would make $357 million (¥2.5 billion) and $100 million in its opening weekend. It grossed $57 million in the first week in China according to Artisan Gateway. This included a gross of $51.3 million during the weekend. The box office gross of the film was impacted by the recent surge in COVID-19 infections in the country. IMAX meanwhile reported that the film marked its best weekend ever in China with a $15.8 million opening. In the second weekend the film grossed $25.9 million for a drop of 55%, and an increase of 42% during the New Year weekend with $36.9 million. Variety predicted that it would continue to dominate the region due to lack of titles offering it competition.

Other territories 

Outside the US and Canada, the film grossed $307.6 million in 52 countries in its first week of release. The largest openings for the film by the end of the week were in China ($56.8 million), South Korea ($24.9 million), France ($21.7 million), Germany ($19.4 million) and India ($19.2 million). In the second weekend it grossed $168.6 million for a drop of 42%. In the third weekend it grossed $186.7 million, an increase of 6% from the previous weekend. In the fourth weekend it grossed $132.6 million for a drop of 30%, while becoming the highest-grossing film of the pandemic era outside the US and Canada. The five largest-running total countries by February 26, 2023, are China ($249.8 million), France ($148.3 million), Germany ($138.3 million), South Korea ($105 million), and the United Kingdom ($91 million). It became the highest-grossing film of all time in twenty box office territories, including Germany, France, Austria, Turkey and New Zealand.

Critical response 
  Audiences polled by CinemaScore gave the film an average grade of "A" on an A+ to F scale, the same as the first Avatar, while PostTrak reported 91% of audience members gave the film a positive score, with 82% saying they would definitely recommend it.

Positive reviews focused on the visual spectacle of the film, and advocated seeing it in as large a format as possible. Chicago-Sun Times critic Richard Roeper gave the film a rating of three and a half out of four stars, highlighting the film's visuals as "some of the most dazzling, vibrant, and gorgeous images ever seen on screen." Variety critic Owen Gleiberman praised the film as a "dizzyingly spectacular sequel" with "miraculously sustained" combat sequences, "scenes that will make your eyes pop, your head spin and your soul race" and "state-of-the-art 3D (never in-your-face, just images that look and feel sculpted) [that] makes the film's every underwater glide feel as experiential as one that you're literally on." On the other hand, Gleiberman felt that the story is "basic" with a "string of serviceable clichés," "bare-bones dialogue" and little dimensionality to the characters. The Atlantic critic David Sims said that the film will wow audiences and exhibit "new delights...in the alien world of Pandora" while noting that the film gets off to a slow start that is "busy with plot details as the film updates the audience on the past decade-plus of Pandoran life."

Los Angeles Times critic Justin Chang hailed Cameron as "one of the few Hollywood visionaries who actually merits that much-abused term" and stated that the film will "stun most of his naysayers into silence", while also praising the film's tenderness and sentimentality. Entertainment Weekly critic Leah Greenblatt summarized her review of The Way of Water saying that it "created its own whole-cloth reality, a meticulous world-building as astonishing and enveloping as anything we've ever seen on screen — until that crown is passed, inevitably, in December 2024, the projected release date for Avatar 3."

However, some critics felt that the film was excessively long, and that the story was not substantial enough to justify the length. The New Yorker critic Anthony Lane opined "The film is more than three hours long, some of it dangerously close to dawdling; not until the final third does Cameron apply the whip and remind us that, in the choreographing of action sequences, he remains unsurpassed." The Guardian critic Peter Bradshaw was critical of the "scathingly bland plot" and noted that despite the shift in setting, "there isn't a single interesting visual image".

San Francisco Chronicle reviewer Mick LaSalle called it "a one-hour story rattling around in a 192-minute bag," while acknowledging that "it looks pretty good," incorporating "one of the best uses of 3-D to date, with visuals that seem to have been conceived in three dimensions." The Telegraph critic Robbie Collin said that the film "has no plot, no stakes and atrocious dialogue" and that "for all its world-building sprawl, The Way of Water is a horizon-narrowing experience – the sad sight of a great filmmaker reversing up a creative cul-de-sac."

The Toronto Star commented that the film was poorly received by some indigenous peoples in Canada, being viewed as trying to portray the colonial struggles of an indigenous population, with reviewer Drew Hayden Taylor noting "It's also rather conventional in its own way and somewhat boring. Predictable. I've been involved in crooked card games with a less foreseeable storyline."

Accolades 

At the 95th Academy Awards, Avatar: The Way of Water received nominations for Best Picture, Best Sound, and Best Production Design; and won Best Visual Effects. The film's other nominations include two Annie Awards (winning both), two British Academy Film Awards (winning one), five Critics' Choice Movie Awards (winning one), and two Golden Globe Awards. It was named one of the ten best films of 2022 by the National Board of Review and the American Film Institute.

Sequels 

The Way of Water is the first of four planned sequels to Avatar. Avatar 3 started filming simultaneously with this film in New Zealand on September 25, 2017. Cast members from previous films, including Worthington, Saldaña, Lang, Weaver, Pounder, Winslet, Curtis, Ribisi, Moore, Rao, Gerald, Dalton, Bliss, Champion, Bass, and Geljo, have all been announced to return while Oona Chaplin, Michelle Yeoh, and David Thewlis will be playing new characters.

Although the last two sequels have been reportedly greenlit, Cameron stated in a November 2017 interview: "Let's face it, if Avatar 2 and 3 don't make enough money, there's not going to be a 4 and 5". Thewlis later confirmed this in February 2018, stating "they're making 2 and 3, they're gonna see if people go and see them, and then they'll make 4 and 5". Conversely, Weaver stated in November 2018, after the first two sequels had completed main photography, that she was currently "busy doing Avatar 4 and 5", which several media outlets interpreted as confirmation that the last two sequels had started filming.

In January 2019, in face of the proposed acquisition of 21st Century Fox by The Walt Disney Company, Disney CEO Bob Iger confirmed that both Avatar 4 and Avatar 5 are being developed but have not been officially greenlit. According to producer Landau in February 2019, Iger may have been misinterpreted. He said that Avatar 4 and 5 "are not only [greenlit]" but also a third of Avatar 4 has already been filmed. Following the box office success of The Way of Water, Cameron confirmed that the sequels are effectively greenlit. "It looks like with the momentum that the film has now that we’ll easily pass our break even in the next few days, so it looks like I can’t wiggle out of this and I’m gonna have to do these other sequels," Cameron said in January 2023, "I know what I’m going to be doing the next six or seven years." It was also confirmed that Brendan Cowell will reprise his role as Captain Mick Scoresby and will also feature the return of Payakan, the Tulkun who befriends Lo'ak.

See also 
 List of films featuring extraterrestrials
 List of films with longest production time
 List of most expensive films
 List of highest-grossing films
 Impact of the COVID-19 pandemic on cinema

Notes

References

External links 

 
 

2020s American films
2020s coming-of-age films
2020s English-language films
2020s science fiction adventure films
2022 3D films
2022 action adventure films
2022 science fiction action films
20th Century Studios films
American 3D films
American action adventure films
American coming-of-age films
American epic films
American films about revenge
American science fiction action films
American science fiction adventure films
American sequel films
American space adventure films
Annie Award winners
Avatar (franchise) films
Casting controversies in film
Disney controversies
Fiction set in extraterrestrial oceans
Fictional-language films
Film productions suspended due to the COVID-19 pandemic
Films about extraterrestrial life
Films about families
Films directed by James Cameron
Films featuring underwater diving
Films postponed due to the COVID-19 pandemic
Films produced by James Cameron
Films produced by Jon Landau
Films scored by Simon Franglen
Films set in the 22nd century
Films set on fictional moons
Films shot in Los Angeles County, California
Films shot in New Zealand
Films that won the Best Visual Effects Academy Award
Films using motion capture
Films with screenplays by James Cameron
Films with underwater settings
IMAX films
Lightstorm Entertainment films
Obscenity controversies in film
TSG Entertainment films
Underwater action films